John Keyes may refer to:

 John Keyes (tenor), American operatic tenor
 John Keyes (soldier) (1745–1824), Adjutant General of the State of Connecticut
 John T. D. Keyes (born 1954), Canadian journalist and editor